The festival ran June 11, 2004 – June 13, 2004, and more than 90,000 people attended. It was marked by torrential rains, creating an incredibly large amount of mud.  Many vehicles had to be towed out of the parking area.

Lineup

June 11th
(artists listed from earliest to latest set times)

What Stage:
Wilco
Bob Dylan
Dave Matthews & Friends
Which Stage:
Los Lonely Boys
Yonder Mountain String Band
Ani Difranco
The String Cheese Incident
This Tent:
Calexico
Neko Case
North Mississippi Allstars Hill Country Revue
Gillian Welch
Praxis
That Tent:
mrnorth
The Black Keys
Patti Smith & Her Band
Yo La Tengo
Vida Blue featuring The Spam Allstars
The Other Tent:
Xavier Rudd
JoJo & His Mojo Mardi Gras Band
Mofro
Chris Robinson and New Earth Mud
Umphrey's McGee

June 12th
(artists listed from earliest to latest set times)

What Stage:
Los Lobos
Gov't Mule
Steve Winwood
The Dead
Which Stage:
Hackensaw Boys
Gomez
My Morning Jacket
Galactic
Primus
This Tent:
Acoustic Syndicate
The Del McCoury Band
Sam Bush Band
Doc Watson
Ween
That Tent:
Kings of Leon
Grandaddy
Beth Orton
Damien Rice
Robert Randolph and the Family Band
The Other Tent:
Blue Merle
Mindy Smith
Robert Earl Keen
Jazz Mandolin Project

June 13th
(artists listed from earliest to latest set times)

What Stage:
Burning Spear
moe.
David Byrne
Trey Anastasio
Which Stage:
Tokyo Ska Paradise Orchestra
Taj Mahal
Femi Kuti
Medeski Martin & Wood
This Tent:
Leftover Salmon
Cracker/Camper Van Beethoven
Barbara Cue
That Tent:
Marc Ribot y Los Cubanos Postizos
The Bad Plus
Soulive
Material
The Other Tent:
Marc Broussard
Donavan Frankenreiter
Guster

Notes
Willie Nelson was originally scheduled to perform but, shortly before the festival, had to cancel his summer 2004 tour due to carpal tunnel syndrome. Steve Winwood was asked to fill in.

Maroon 5 was also on the bill, but did not appear at their performance time, citing a sore throat by lead vocalist Adam Levine.

Superjam
(Core band members only, guests not included)

George Porter (bass), Stanton Moore (drums), and Eric Krasno and Neil Evans of Soulive (guitar and keyboard).

References

Bonnaroo Music Festival by year
2004 in American music
2004 music festivals
2004 in Tennessee
Bonnaroo